Julius Mayer may refer to:
 Julius Robert von Mayer (1814–1878), German physicist and physician
 Julius Marshuetz Mayer (1865–1925), United States lawyer and federal judge